Ayoub Falih Hasan Al-Raie, born 1978, known by his nom de guerre Abu Azrael, also known as the Angel of Death, is an Iraqi Commander in the popular crowd of the Kataib al-Imam Ali, an Iraqi Shi'a militia group of the Popular Mobilization Forces that is fighting ISIS in Iraq. He has become a public icon of resisting ISIS in Iraq among Shia Iraqis with a large following on social media. His motto and catchphrase is "Ella Tahin", literally meaning "Until/into dust" interpreted to mean "Grind you to dust."

Abu Azrael was a former member in Muqtada al-Sadr's Mahdi Army which fought against the U.S./Coalition forces during the U.S.-led invasion of Iraq.

Personal life
Abu Azrael is described in various sources as a Shia Muslim who is a 40-year-old former university lecturer and a one-time Taekwondo champion. According to an Iranian source, Reports from March 2015 claimed that Azrael is a father of five, and lives an "ordinary life" when not on the battlefield.

Following incidents where he was filmed desecrating the corpses of ISIS fighters, Azrael stated that he had been told by a senior imam in Najaf that he should pray for penance and "never do such a thing again".

In October 2019, he was severely beaten unconscious by protesting Iraqis at Tahrir Square, Baghdad.

In 2020, he was infected with COVID-19 and suffered lung damage.

Public image
Abu Azrael fought against ISIS, although he has also fought against other militant groups. He has attracted attention in the Middle East, but by the spring of 2015, he had also made front-page appearances on international news websites in England, France and the United States.

He has received a medal of honor from the Representative of the Supreme Religious Authority Sayyid Ahmad al-Safi.

In 2016, he was spotted on the battlefield in the Battle of Mosul.

See also 

 Harith al-Sudani
 Abu Tahsin al-Salhi
 Salam Jassem Hussein
 Azrael

References

Living people
Members of the Popular Mobilization Forces
Iraqi Shia Muslims
Iraqi military personnel
People from Baghdad
1978 births
People of the War in Iraq (2013–2017)
Iraqi conspiracy theorists
Taxi drivers